is a mountain with a height of  in the Northwest Highlands of Scotland. It lies south of Glen Shiel, near Kinloch Hourn. A rocky and craggy peak, it is usually the last Munro to be climbed.

References

Mountains and hills of the Northwest Highlands
Marilyns of Scotland
Munros